Milorad 'Mile' Krstev (born 13 May 1979 in Negotino, SR Macedonia) is a Macedonian retired international footballer who last played for FK Metalurg Skopje.

International career
He made his senior debut for Republic of Macedonia in a November 1996 friendly match away against Malta and has earned a total of 22 caps, scoring 2 goals. His final international was a June 2005 FIFA World Cup qualification match against the Czech Republic.

References

External links
 Profile at MacedonianFootball.com 
 

1979 births
Living people
People from Negotino
Association football midfielders
Macedonian footballers
North Macedonia international footballers
FK Pobeda players
Athinaikos F.C. players
SC Heerenveen players
SC Veendam players
FC Groningen players
FK Metalurg Skopje players
Super League Greece players
Eredivisie players
Eerste Divisie players
Macedonian First Football League players
Macedonian expatriate footballers
Expatriate footballers in Greece
Macedonian expatriate sportspeople in Greece
Expatriate footballers in the Netherlands
Macedonian expatriate sportspeople in the Netherlands